Kevin Henkes (born November 27, 1960) is an American writer and illustrator of children's books. As an illustrator he won the Caldecott Medal for Kitten's First Full Moon (2004). Two of his books were Newbery Medal Honor Books, Olive's Ocean in 2004 and The Year of Billy Miller in 2014. His picture book Waiting was named both a 2016 Caldecott Honor Book and a Geisel Honor Book. It was only the second time any author has won that combination of awards.

Career
Kevin Henkes (pronounced HANK-us) thought he would be an artist until his junior year of high school when one of his teachers encouraged him in his writing efforts. He discovered that children's books combined both his literary and artistic interests.

Henkes writes and illustrates children's picture books, many of which feature mice as their main characters. He also writes middle-grade fiction. Henkes wrote his first book during his freshman year in college. The book's theme deals with how a child describes the pleasures of occasional solitude. This theme is common in many of Henkes' later books. Henkes, one of five children, says that many of his storylines are inspired by his family and the neighborhood where he grew up in Racine, Wisconsin. Henkes has written and illustrated around fifty critically acclaimed and award-winning picture books, early readers, and novels in his career thus far.

Henkes' first book, All Alone, was published in 1981 by Greenwillow Books. More than 50 books followed, including Chrysanthemum and Lilly's Purple Plastic Purse. In 1994 Henkes was a runner-up for one of the premier American Library Association (ALA) children's book awards, the Caldecott Medal for Owen, one of his mouse books. In 2004, he was a runner-up for the Newbery Medal for Olive's Ocean. The next year he won the Caldecott Medal for Kitten's First Full Moon, recognizing that as the year's best children's picture book published in the U.S. All of his books to date have been published by Greenwillow Books.

Henkes won the inaugural Phoenix Picture Book Award in 2013 for Owen. The Phoenix Awards from the Children's Literature Association recognize the best books that did not win major awards when they were first published twenty years earlier. In 2014, he received a Newbery Honor for his book, The Year of Billy Miller. In 2020 Henkes was awarded the ALA's Children's Literature Legacy Award, celebrating his entire body of work.

Henkes and his wife, Laura Dronzek, have been collaborating on a series of picture books based on the four seasons. Henkes writes the story, while Dronzek provides the acrylic painting illustrations. The next title expected is Winter is Here.

Early and personal life
Henkes was born in Racine, Wisconsin.
He is a graduate of the University of Wisconsin-Madison. He lives in Madison with his wife, artist Laura Dronzek, and their two children.

Works

Novels

Return to Sender (1984)
Two Under Par (1987)
The Zebra Wall (1988) – Council of Wisconsin Writers Children's Book Award
Words of Stone (1992)
Protecting Marie (1995)
Sun & Spoon (1997)
The Birthday Room (1999)
Olive's Ocean (2004) – Newbery Honor Book
Bird Lake Moon (2008)
Junonia (2011)
The Year of Billy Miller (2013) – Newbery Honor Book
Sweeping up the Heart (2018)
Billy Miller Makes a Wish (2020)

Picture books

All Alone (1981)
Clean Enough (1982)
Margaret & Taylor (1983)
Bailey Goes Camping (1985)
Grandpa & Bo (1986) – Council of Wisconsin Writers Children’s Book Award 
Once Around the Block (1987) – Library of Congress Best Books of the Year
Jessica (1989)
Shhhh (1989)
The Biggest Boy (1995), illustrated by Nancy Tafuri
Good-bye, Curtis (1995), illustrated by Marisabina Russo
Circle Dogs (1998), illustrated by Dan Yaccarino – Charlotte Zolotow Commendation
Oh! (2000)
Kitten's First Full Moon (2004) – Caldecott Medal, Charlotte Zolotow Award, Council of Wisconsin Writers Archer-Eckblad Children’s Picture Book Honorable Mention
A Good Day (2007) – Charlotte Zolotow Commendation
Birds (2009), illustrated by Laura Dronzek – Charlotte Zolotow Honor
Old Bear (2009) – Charlotte Zolotow Commendation
My Garden (2010) – Charlotte Zolotow Commendation
Little White Rabbit (2011)
Waiting (2015) – Caldecott Honor, Geisel Honor
When Spring Comes (2016), illustrated by Laura Dronzek
Egg (2017)
In the Middle of Fall (2017), illustrated by Laura Dronzek
A Parade of Elephants (2018)
Winter Is Here (2018), illustrated by Laura Dronzek
Summer Song (2020), illustrated by Laura Dronzek
Sun Flower Lion (2020)
A House (2021)
Little Houses (2022), illustrated by Laura Dronzek

Mouse books

A Weekend with Wendell (1986) – Children's Choices 1987
Sheila Rae, the Brave (1987)
Chester's Way (1988) – ALA Notable Children's Books 1988
Julius, the Baby of the World (1990) – ALA Notable Children's Books 1990, Booklist Editors Choice 1990
Chrysanthemum (1991) – Council of Wisconsin Writers Betty Ren Wright Children’s Picture Book Award
Owen (1993) – Caldecott Honor, Council of Wisconsin Writers Archer-Eckblad Children’s Picture Book Award, Phoenix Picture Book Award 2013
Lilly's Purple Plastic Purse (1996)
Wemberly Worried (2000) – ALA Notable Children's Book 2000, Parenting Magazine Reading Magic Award 2000, Publishers Weekly Best Children's Books 2001, School Library Journal Best Children's Books 2001
Sheila Rae's Peppermint Stick (2001), a board book
Owen's Marshmallow Chick (2002), a board book – Charlotte Zolotow Commendation
Wemberley's Ice Cream Star (2003), a board book
Julius' Candy Corn (2003), a board book
Lilly's Chocolate Heart (2003), a board book
Lilly's Big Day (2006) – Charlotte Zolotow Commendation
Penny and Her Song (2012)
Penny and Her Doll (2012)
Penny and Her Marble (2013) – Geisel Honor
Penny and Her Sled (2019)

Notes

References

External links

 
 Caldecott Medal
 Kevin Henkes Audio Name Pronunciation at TeachingBooks.net
 

1960 births
American children's writers
Caldecott Medal winners
American children's book illustrators
Newbery Honor winners
Writers from Madison, Wisconsin
Writers from Racine, Wisconsin
Writers from Wisconsin
University of Wisconsin–Madison alumni
Living people
20th-century American novelists
21st-century American novelists
American male novelists
20th-century American male writers
21st-century American male writers
Novelists from Wisconsin